Dreams from R'lyeh is a collection of poems by Lin Carter. The book was released in hardcover by Arkham House in 1975 in an edition of 3,152 copies.  It was Carter's only book published by Arkham House. The title sequence of sonnets, "Dreams from R'lyeh", has also been reprinted in Robert M. Price's The Xothic Legend Cycle: The Complete Mythos Fiction of Lin Carter (Chaosium, 1997).

Background
Carter conceived the sonnet-cycle "Dreams from R'lyeh" as early as 1959, as revealed by a note in his 1959 publication Letter to Judith, where the cycle is announced as forthcoming. Most of the poems were written in the mid-late 1960s, with some appearing in The Arkham Collector and most appearing across four issues of Amra. The sequence of numbered poems was not initially the same as it is in the Arkham House volume.

Summary
The Sonnet Cycle, "Dreams from R'lyeh", that comprises the first two-thirds of the book, consists of poems inspired by H. P. Lovecraft and the Cthulhu Mythos. Unlike Lovecraft's Fungi from Yuggoth, the sonnets of which do not tell a continuous story, Dreams from R'lyeh from start to finish clearly narrates the story of Wilbur Nathaniel Hoag, from his childhood to just before his disappearance in late 1944. Mental (and perhaps physical) degeneration are apparent near the last sonnet.

The remainder of the verses are on various topics, celebrating other fantasy authors or reflecting on fantastic themes. "Diombar's Song of the Last Battle" is a heroic poem set in the prehistory of Carter's "Thongor" novels, and "Death-Song of Conan the Cimmerian" an end-of-life summation of Robert E. Howard's barbarian hero Conan, written from the perspective of the character himself.

Contents

 "Merlin on the Queens Express", by L. Sprague de Camp
 Dreams from R'lyeh: A Sonnet Cycle
I. "Remembrances"
II. "Arkham"
III. "The Festival"
IV. "The Old Wood"
V. "The Locked Attic"
VI. "The Shunned Church"
VII. "The Last Ritual"
VIII. "The Library"
IX. "Black Thirst"
X. "The Elder Age"
XI. "Lost R'lyeh"
XII. "Unknown Kadath"
XIII. "Abdul Alhazred"
XIV. "Hyperborea"
XV. "The Book of Eibon"
XVI. "Tsathoggua"
XVII. "Black Zimbabwe"
XVIII. "The Return"
XIX. "The Sabbat"
XX. "Black Lotus"
XXI. "The Unspeakable"
XXII. "Carcosa"
XXIII. "The Candidate"
XXIV. "The Dream-Daemon"
XXV. "Dark Yuggoth"
XXVI. "The Silver Key"
XXVII. "The Peaks Beyond Throk"
XXVIII. "Spawn of the Black Goat"
XXIX. "Beyond"
XXX. "The Accursed"
XXXI. "The Million favored Ones"
 Other Poems
 "Lunae Custodiens"
 "Merlin, Enchanted"
 "To Clark Ashton Smith"
 "Once in Fabled Grandeur"
 "The Night Kings"
 "All Hallow's Eve"
 "Shard"
 "The Wind in the Rigging"
 "Diombar's Song of the Last Battle"
 "The Elf-King's Castle"
 "To Lord Dunsany"
 "The Forgotten"
 "Golden Age"
 "Lines Written to a Painting by Hannes Bok"
 "Death-Song of Conan the Cimmerian"
 "Author's Note"

Reception
Fritz Leiber, reviewing the collection in Fantastic, cites "[o]ne poem, "Shard," [as] very nice," and comments on the "delightfully Cthulhu-cultish cover by Tim Kirk, best current Arkham artist," while otherwise singling out isolated lines from various of its poems for approval or disapproval.

The collection was also reviewed by W. N. MacPherson in The Science Fiction Review, May 1975, Daniel Bailey in Myrddin, August 1975, Stuart David Schiff in Whispers #6/7, June 1975, and #8, December 1975, and C. D. Whateley in Crypt of Cthulhu #13, Roodmas 1983.

Notes

1975 poetry books
American poetry collections
Poetry by Lin Carter
Cthulhu Mythos stories
Arkham House books
Fantasy poetry